Tropidia rostrata is a species of hoverfly in the family Syrphidae.

Distribution
United States.

References

Eristalinae
Diptera of Asia
Insects described in 1930